Pigritia is a genus of moths in the family Blastobasidae.

Species

Pigritia arizonella
Pigritia astuta Meyrick, 1918
Pigritia biatomella (Walsingham, 1897)
Pigritia dido
Pigritia faux
Pigritia fidella
Pigritia gruis
Pigritia haha
Pigritia laticapitella
Pigritia marjoriella
Pigritia medeocris Walsingham, 1897
Pigritia murtfeldtella
Pigritia ochrocomella
Pigritia sedis
Pigritia stips
Pigritia troctis Meyrick, 1922
Pigritia ululae
Pigritia uuku

References

 
 
 , 2013: Review of the Blastobasinae of Costa Rica (Lepidoptera: Gelechioidea: Blastobasidae). Zootaxa 3618 (1): 1-223. Review and full article: 
 , 2012: Three new species of Hawaiian moths from Kahoolawe island (Lepidoptera: Crambidae & Coleophoridae. Zootaxa 3341: 59-63.

Blastobasidae
Blastobasidae genera